Anomalomyidae is a family of extinct muroid rodents from Europe.

References 

Muroid rodents
Miocene rodents
Pliocene rodents
Pleistocene rodents
Prehistoric mammals of Europe
Miocene first appearances
Pleistocene extinctions